Antaeotricha arizonensis (Ferris's antaeotricha moth) is a moth of the family Depressariidae. It is found in the United States in the mountain ranges in south-eastern Arizona and south-western New Mexico. Although  Antaeotricha arizonensis are easily differentiated within their genus through the dark spots on their forewings, the distinction between sexes of A. arizonensis can be complicated. The sexes of A. arizonensis (male&female) differentiate between themselves by distinct characteristics on their antennas and anatomy of their genitalia(Ferris, 59)

Adults are on wing from mid-June to October, suggesting more than one generation.

Larvae have been reared from Quercus hypoleucoides.

Etymology
The name arizonensis (adjective) denotes the geographic locality from which the species is described.

External links
A new Antaeotricha species from Southeastern Arizona (Gelechioidea, Elachistidae, Stenomatinae)
Images

Ferris, Clifford D. “A new Antaeotricha species from Southeastern Arizona (Gelechioidea, Elachistidae, Stenomatinae).” ZooKeys ,57 59-62. 21 Sep. 2010, doi:10.3897/zookeys.57.462

Moths described in 2010
arizonensis
Moths of North America